Frank E. Bradley (February 3, 1918 – December 2, 2002) was an American Negro league pitcher between 1937 and 1942.

A native of Benton, Louisiana, Bradley made his Negro leagues debut in 1937 with the Kansas City Monarchs. He played six seasons with Kansas City through 1942. Bradley died in Benton in 2002 at age 84.
In some sources, his career is combined with that of Provine Bradley.

References

External links
 and Seamheads

1918 births
2002 deaths
Kansas City Monarchs players
People from Benton, Louisiana
20th-century African-American sportspeople
Baseball pitchers
21st-century African-American people